Robinsons Gapan is a shopping mall located along Pan-Philippine Highway in Gapan. It is owned and operated by Robinsons Land Corporation, one of the largest mall operators in the Philippines. The mall opened on November 30, 2022. The mall is the second Robinsons Mall in the province of Nueva Ecija, and the 46th under the Robinsons brand. It is also the second-largest mall in Nueva Ecija, only behind SM City Cabanatuan. It has a gross floor area of over 40,000 m2.

Features
The mall anchors Robinsons Supermarket, Robinsons Department Store, Robinsons Movieworld, Eat Street, and other major anchors. The mall also houses other mainstream and local business outlets with Edna’s Cakeland, NE Pacific Bakeshop, CLT Café, 3JR Pasalubong, and Tago Café. The mall features four state-of-the-art cinemas.

Gallery

See also
SM City Cabanatuan
Robinsons Townville Cabanatuan
Robinsons Malls
NE Pacific Mall

References

Shopping malls in the Philippines
Robinsons Malls
Shopping malls established in 2022